Association Sportive de Corbeil-Essonnes was a football team located in Corbeil-Essonnes, France. Founded in 1951, it was the football section of the parent multi-sport club AS Corbeil-Essonnes, but the section stopped operations in 2016. The colours of the team were green and white.

History 
AS Corbeil-Essonnes was founded in 1951 as the product of a merger between FC Corbeil and Sporting Club Essonne. The highest tier it played at in its history was the Division 2, which it reached on two occasions: in 1982–83 and in 1984–85. The furthest Corbeil-Essonnes progressed in the Coupe de France was the round of 64, achieving this feat in the 1960–61 and 1984–85 editions of the tournament.

In 2016, the football section of AS Corbeil-Essonnes closed down.

Managerial history 

  
 1970–1979:  
 1979–1980:  
1982–1983:  Osvaldo Piazza
 1988–1989:  
 1993–1994:  Camille Choquier
 1994–1998:  Rudi Garcia
 2001–2003:  Isaac N'Gata

Notable former players 

  
  Frédéric Bompard
  Demba Diagouraga
  Rudi Garcia
  
 Guy Nosibor
 Stéphane Persol
  Osvaldo Piazza
  Walid Regragui
  Djamel Zidane

Honours

References

External links 
 Club website

Sport in Essonne
Association football clubs established in 1951
1951 establishments in France
Defunct football clubs in France
2016 disestablishments in France
Association football clubs disestablished in 2016
Football clubs in Île-de-France